Minister of Veterans Affairs may refer to:
 Minister for Veterans' Affairs (Australia)
 Minister of Veterans Affairs (Canada)
 Ministry of Veterans Affairs (China)
 Ministry of Croatian Veterans
 List of French Ministers of Veterans Affairs
 United States Secretary of Veterans Affairs
 Ministry for Veterans Affairs (Ukraine)